Elections to Nuneaton and Bedworth Borough Council took place on 22 May 2014. They coincided with other local elections happening in the UK that day, as well as the 2014 election to the European Parliament.

Labour retained control of the council, gaining 3 seats and winning back Arbury ward that was won by the Conservatives in a December 2013 byelection.

Election results

2014 Election

Council make up
Total number of seats on the council after the elections:

Ward Results

Abbey Ward

Arbury Ward

Attleborough Ward

Barpool Ward

Bede Ward

Bulkington Ward

Camp Hill Ward

Exhall Ward

Galley Common Ward

Heath Ward

Kingswood Ward

Poplar Ward

Slough Ward

St. Nicolas Ward

Weddington Ward

Wem Brook Ward

Whitestone Ward

References

2014
2014 English local elections
2010s in Warwickshire